Chuypetlovo Knoll (‘Chuypetlovska Mogila’ \chuy-pe-'tlov-ska mo-'gi-labi-gla\) is the conspicuous rocky ridge in Beaglehole Glacier extending 3.7 km in southeast-northwest direction, 1.9 km wide and rising to 960 m southwest of Bigla Ridge on Foyn Coast, Antarctic Peninsula.

The feature is named after the settlement of Chuypetlovo in Western Bulgaria.

Location
British mapping in 1976.

Maps
 British Antarctic Territory.  Scale 1:200000 topographic map. DOS 610 Series, Sheet W 66 64.  Directorate of Overseas Surveys, Tolworth, UK, 1976.
 Antarctic Digital Database (ADD). Scale 1:250000 topographic map of Antarctica. Scientific Committee on Antarctic Research (SCAR). Since 1993, regularly upgraded and updated.

Notes

References
 Chuypetlovo Knoll. SCAR Composite Antarctic Gazetteer.
 Bulgarian Antarctic Gazetteer. Antarctic Place-names Commission. (details in Bulgarian, basic data in English)

External links
 Chuypetlovo Knoll. Copernix satellite image

Ridges of Graham Land
Foyn Coast
Bulgaria and the Antarctic